Bilel Agueni (born 4 January 1995) is a French professional footballer who plays as a midfielder for Championnat National 2 club Hyères. He previously played for Istres, where he made three appearances in Ligue 2 during the 2013–14 season.

Personal life
Born in France, Agueni is of Algerian descent.

Career statistics

References

External links

1995 births
Living people
French footballers
French sportspeople of Algerian descent
Association football midfielders
FC Istres players
LB Châteauroux players
Athlético Marseille players
Aubagne FC players
Hyères FC players
Ligue 2 players
Championnat National players
Championnat National 3 players
Championnat National 2 players